Solingen Hauptbahnhof is the only railway station in Solingen, Germany, to be served by ICE and IC long distance trains. Solingen-Mitte station serves central Solingen, but only has Regionalbahn trains.

History
The first station in the area of present-day town of Solingen was built with the opening of the Gruiten-Cologne-Mülheim railway by the Bergisch-Märkische Railway Company. The station opened on 25 September 1867 and was named Ohligs Wald ("Ohligs forest"). That same year a branch line to Solingen was built from this station. In 1890, the Wald part of the name was dropped and with the incorporation of Ohligs into Solingen in 1929, the station was renamed Solingen-Ohligs. In 1894, the line from Hilden was opened.

The importance of the Solingen-Ohligs station always exceeded that of the other stations in Solingen, including the old Solingen Hauptbahnhof, since only Ohligs station is located on a main line. Consequently, it was the stopping point for long-distance traffic. This factor lead to the discussion of renaming this station to Hauptbahnhof and giving the Hauptbahnhof a new name. These discussions, however, never came to a conclusion, so the station kept its name until the end of 2006. With the decommissioning of the old Hauptbahnhof in May 2006, Solingen-Ohligs station was renamed as Solingen Hauptbahnhof on 10 December 2006.

Notes

External links 
 
 

Railway stations in North Rhine-Westphalia
Railway stations in Germany opened in 1867
1867 establishments in Prussia
Rhine-Ruhr S-Bahn stations
S1 (Rhine-Ruhr S-Bahn)
S7 (Rhine-Ruhr S-Bahn)
Hauptbahnhof